El camino de los espantos ("The Specters' Road") is a 1967 Mexican horror comedy film. It is directed by Gilberto Martínez Solares and is the last installment of the Viruta y Capulina film franchise. It stars Marco Antonio Campos and Gaspar Henaine, Elsa Cárdenas, and Salomé.

Cast
Marco Antonio Campos as Viruta
Gaspar Henaine as Capulina
Elsa Cárdenas as Adelita
Salomé as Valentina
Crox Alvarado as Zopilote
Guillermo Rivas as Policeman
Consuelo Monteagudo as Matilde
Mario García as Serapio
Arturo Ripstein as Matilde and Serapio's Son (credited as Arturo Rossen)
Nathanael León as Telegraphist
Manuel Barrera Nápoli as Bartender

External links
 

1960s comedy horror films
Mexican comedy horror films
1967 horror films
1960s Spanish-language films
1967 films
Films with screenplays by Roberto Gómez Bolaños
1967 comedy films
1960s Mexican films